Julian Rochfort Belfrage (19 February 1934 – 28 December 1994) was an actor's agent whose clients included Dame Judi Dench, Sir John Hurt, Daniel Day-Lewis, David Warner, Sir Ian Holm and Colin Blakely. For ten years he was in partnership with Michael Whitehall under the brand Leading Artists.

Belfrage's obituary in The Independent stated that he ‘often fired clients he did not like and yet the lowest he would sink in condemnation was that such and such didn't know how to live’. Belfrage, however, was a true bon viveur.  He had a particular love of the turf which he playfully enjoyed with John Hurt and Christopher Reeve. Despite his success, he was described as caring not one jot for money, unless it afforded a day at the races.

Life
Julian Rochfort Belfrage was born in London on 19 February 1934, the son of Bruce Belfrage, who read the nine o'clock news during World War II, and the actress Joan Henley.  He started his career as the understudy to Peter Barkworth in a London play, Roar Like a Dove.  Despite the theatrical background of his family it was not entirely a success, and Belfrage was later persuaded to use his talents to become a theatrical agent with Kenneth Carten.  In the 1960s he joined another London agency, Terence Plunkett-Green, before going into partnership with Michael Whitehall trading as Leading Artists. When his partnership with Whitehall ended, he set up Julian Belfrage Associates.

Belfrage persuaded Daniel Day-Lewis to play Christy Brown in My Left Foot, a part for which Day-Lewis won an Oscar.  Belfrage described the moment as the happiest day of his life.  During the course of his career, his clients included Dame Judi Dench, Sir John Hurt, Daniel Day-Lewis, David Warner, Sir Ian Holm and Colin Blakely.

An ardent racegoer, Belfrage owned several racehorses.  He died in London on 28 December 1994 and a number of races were subsequently named in his honour; the Julian Belfrage Memorial Chase was held at Towcester Racecourse on 19 March 1997.  Belfrage married firstly, Gilly Pratt, by whom he had two sons, one of whom, Crispian Belfrage, became a Hollywood actor.  He married secondly, Victoria Van Moyland, who inherited Belfrage's agency. On Belfrage's death, Daniel Day-Lewis is said to have suffered a nervous breakdown as Belfrage had become a father figure in his life.

References

1934 births
1994 deaths
British talent agents